The Magnum Research BFR is a single-action revolver manufactured by Magnum Research. Modelled after the Colt Single Action Army, it is made from stainless steel and chambered for a number of very powerful pistol calibers, such as .500 S&W Magnum, as well as several calibers traditionally used in rifles, such as .30-30 WCF, .450 Marlin and .45-70 Government. The name "BFR" officially is an acronym for "Big Frame Revolver", although other meanings such as "Big Finest Revolver", "Biggest, Finest Revolver", and even "Big Fucking Revolver" have also been used.

Available cartridges
The BFR comes in two basic models, one with a long cylinder for larger rifle cartridges, and one with a more traditional revolver cylinder length (called "short" by Magnum Research). Some models that use identical bores, such as the .45/70 and .450 Marlin, can be made with two cylinders for the same gun.

These revolvers were originally made by D-MAX in Springfield, South Dakota, until Magnum Research bought them out.

Long cylinder
 .30-30 Winchester (Production Caliber)
 .38-55 Winchester (Precision Center Custom Caliber)
 .375 Winchester (Precision Center Custom Caliber)
 .444 Marlin (Precision Center Custom Caliber)
 .45 Colt/.410 (Production Caliber)(Not available in California due to legal restrictions)
 .45-70 Government (Production Caliber)
 .45-90 Winchester (Precision Center Custom Caliber)
 .450 Marlin (Precision Center Custom Caliber)
 .460 S&W Magnum (Production Caliber)
 .500 S&W Magnum (Production Caliber)
 .50 Beowulf (Precision Center Custom Caliber)
 .500 Bushwhacker (Custom conversion with muzzle brake)

Short cylinder
 .22 Hornet (Precision Center Custom Caliber) (discontinued)
 .218 Bee (Precision Center Custom Caliber) (discontinued)
 .44 Remington Magnum (Production Caliber)
 .454 Casull (Production Caliber)
 .480 Ruger/.475 Linebaugh (Precision Center Custom Caliber)
 .50 GI (Precision Center Custom Caliber)
 .50 Action Express (Precision Center Custom Caliber)
 .500 JRH (Precision Center Custom Caliber)

Gallery

See also
 Desert Eagle
 List of firearms

References

External links
 
 Owner's Manual
 BFR Handbook

.44 Magnum firearms
.50 caliber handguns
Magnum Research revolvers
Revolvers of the United States